Davide Toffolo (born January 17, 1965, Pordenone, Italy) is an Italian author of comics books, including graphic non-fiction works, and musician.

Life and work 
Davide Toffolo studied at the DAMS (Dipartimento di Arte, Musica e Spettacolo – In English: Department of Arts, Music and Entertainment) of the University of Bologna.

When Davide Toffolo started to play music, his native town Pordenone was already one of the most important cities for the Italian punk rock scene which emerged in the late 1970s because of the closeness of the American military base in Aviano. Members of his band, Tre Allegri Ragazzi Morti (Three happy dead boys), are known for wearing a skull masks and not letting the fans take pictures or videos without the skull masks.

In 2005 his band together with a few bands from the neighboring Slovenia, which has a similar punk rock tradition from the 1970s, went to an overseas concert tour in South America. It could be assumed that conversing with fellow punk musicians from Slovenia he had heard of the existence of Gonars concentration camp for the first time, and decided to write the non-fiction comic book titled Italian winter about it in 2010. It is based on documents from official archives in Slovenia, collected by Paola Bristot, art historian at University of Bologna.

Comic books 
 Piera degli Spiriti (with Giovanni Mattioli), Kappa Edizioni, 1996
 Animali (with Giovanni Mattioli), Kappa Edizioni, 1998
 Fregoli, Kappa Edizioni, 1998
 Fare Fumetti, Vivacomix, 2000
 Carnera, la montagna che cammina, Vivacomix
 Intervista a Pasolini, Biblioteca dell'immagine, 2002
 Anatomia di una adolescenza, Vivacomix, 2005
 Il re bianco, Coconino Press, 2005
 Très! Fumetti per il teatro, Coconino Press, 2008
 Lezioni di fumetto, Coniglio editore, 2009
 L'inverno d'Italia (in English "Italian winter"), Coconino Press, 2010

Comic series 
 Fandango, Cult Comix, 1999–2001
 Cinque allegri ragazzi morti

References

1965 births
Living people
Italian comics writers